Sphodromantis annobonensis is a species of praying mantis in the family Mantidae. It occurs on the island of Annobón, Equatorial Guinea.

See also
African mantis
List of mantis genera and species

References

Annobonensis
Mantodea of Africa
Fauna of Annobón
Insects described in 1967